An electronic pollbook, also known as an e-pollbook, is typically either hardware, software or a combination of the two that allows election officials to review and/or maintain voter register information for an election, but does not actually count votes. This software or hardware is used in place of paper-based pollbooks, which are typically three-ring binders. Often, the functions of an e-pollbook include voter lookup, verification, identification, precinct assignment, ballot assignment, voter history update and other functions such as name change, address change and/or redirecting voters to correct voting location.

When voters have a choice of multiple vote centers where they may vote, e-pollbooks communicating over the internet can prevent a voter from voting more than once.

Where e-pollbooks are deployed, they have consolidated broad data (from entire city, county and/or federated state) into usable information at a polling place and have replaced a paper-based system or complemented the paper processes. This consolidation has replaced or supplemented a manual process, usually a telephone call, from a precinct back to the local or regional board of elections. Normally, the information handled by an e-pollbook is public information that can be found in public or online.

More jurisdictions are adopting electronic pollbooks in place of paper-based pollbooks. For example, in January 2014, the City of Chicago reached an agreement with Election Systems & Software  to provide more than 2,100 ExpressPoll voter check-in and verification devices to support the city's 1.6 million registered voters. The e-pollbook system was first used in Chicago's 2014 primary elections.

Issues

In 2020 Williamson County TX found two problems: that its use of e-pollbooks sometimes assigned the wrong ballot style to voters, so they voted on contests outside their area, and did not vote on contests in their own area; and that some ballots did not display the voters' precincts.

In 2006, at least two vendors had problems with e-pollbooks, including Diebold in Maryland in September 2006 and Sequoia Voting Systems in Denver, Colorado in November 2006.

References 

Election technology
Elections